The 9th Annual TV Week Logie Awards were presented on Monday 10 April 1967 at the Zodiac Room aboard the cruise liner Fairstar in Melbourne. Bert Newton from the Nine Network was the Master of Ceremonies. American television actor Vic Morrow was a guest presenter. This article lists the winners of Logie Awards (Australian television) for 1967:

Awards

Gold Logie
Most Popular Male Personality on Australian Television
Winner: Graham Kennedy

Most Popular Female Personality on Australian Television
Winner: Hazel Phillips

Special Gold Logie
Star of the Decade
Winner: Graham Kennedy

Logie

National
Best Teenage Personality
Winner: Johnny Young

Best Live Show
Winner: Sound of Music, Nine Network

Best Overseas Show
Winner: The Man from U.N.C.L.E.
 
Best Commercial
Winner: Minties

Best Documentary Series
Winner: Project 66, Nine Network

Best Drama
Winner: Homicide, Seven Network
 
Best Comedy
Winner: My Name's McGooley, What's Yours?, Seven Network

Victoria
Most Popular Male
Winner: Graham Kennedy

Most Popular Female 
Winner: Patti Newton

Most Popular Live Show
Winner: In Melbourne Tonight, Nine Network

New South Wales
Most Popular Male
Winner: Don Lane

Most Popular Female 
Winner: Hazel Phillips

Most Popular Live Show 
Winner: The Don Lane Tonight Show, Nine Network

South Australia
Most Popular Male  
Winner: Ernie Sigley

Most Popular Female
Winner: Pam Western

Most Popular Live Show 
Winner: Adelaide Tonight, Nine Network

Queensland
Most Popular Male
Winner: Don Seccombe

Most Popular Female 
Winner: Jill McCann

Most Popular Live Show
Winner: Theatre Royal, Seven Network

Tasmania
Most Popular Male
Winner: John Forster

Most Popular Female 
Winner: Robyn Nevin; Caroline Schmit

Most Popular Live Show
Winner: Line Up, ABC

Special Achievement Award
Winner:
Tommy Hanlon, Jr. - For pioneering of television on a nationwide basis. 
The Seekers - For the promotion of Australian TV talent overseas.

External links

Australian Television: 1966-1969 Logie Awards 
TV Week Logie Awards: 1967

1967 television awards
1967 in Australian television
1967